Wood Hall is a community in Clarendon, Jamaica. There is also a Wood Hall in St. Catherine, Jamaica. The former Prime Minister of Jamaica, Portia Simpson-Miller, was born in Wood Hall, St. Catherine in 1945.

References

Populated places in Jamaica